Mi Sueño may refer to:

Music
Mi Sueño (Marlon album). 2006
Mi Sueño (Merche album), 2002
Mi Sueño (Ibrahim Ferrer album) 2007
Mi Sueño, 2010 album by Ana Isabelle
"Mi Sueno", single by Vicente Fernández, written V. Fernández 1976
"Mi Sueño", 2000 song by Luis Fonsi from the album Eterno
"Mi Sueño", 2008 song by Franco De Vita from the album Simplemente La Verdad

Other uses
Mi Sueno (horse), winner of the 2009 Sorrento Stakes

See also
Sueño (disambiguation)